Events from the year 1945 in France.

Incumbents
Chairman of the Provisional Government (also Prime Minister): Charles de Gaulle

Events
1 January? – Jean-Paul Sartre refuses the Legion of Honour.
6 February – Writer Robert Brasillach executed for collaboration with the Germans.
9 March – Japanese overthrow the Vichy French Decoux Government in Vietnam.
2 May – Colette is the first woman to be admitted to the Académie Goncourt.
7 May – General Alfred Jodl signs unconditional surrender terms at Rheims, ending Germany's participation in the war. The document will take effect the next day.
8 May – World War II ends in Europe.
8–29 May – In Algeria, French troops kill an estimated 6,000 Algerian citizens in the Sétif massacre.
23 July – Marshal Philippe Pétain, who headed the Vichy government during World War II, goes on trial, charged with treason.
31 July – Pierre Laval, fugitive former leader of Vichy France, surrenders to Allied soldiers in Austria.
19–30 August – Việt Minh under Hồ Chí Minh carry out the August Revolution in Vietnam.
October – École nationale d'administration established.
15 October – Former premier of Vichy France, Pierre Laval, is executed by firing squad for treason.
21 October – Legislative Election held. Women are allowed to vote for the first time.
13 November – Charles de Gaulle elected head of a French provisional government.
2 December – French banks (Banque de France, BNCI, CNEP, Crédit Lyonnais, and Société Générale) nationalized.
21 December – André Malraux is appointed minister of information by de Gaulle.
Duralex glass tableware manufacturers established in La Chapelle-Saint-Mesmin.
La tennis Bensimon business is founded.

Births
22 January – Jean-Pierre Nicolas, racing driver and manager
17 February – Bernard Rapp, film director and television news presenter (died 2006)
4 April – Daniel Cohn-Bendit, political activist and politician
7 April – Joël Robuchon, chef (died 2018)
15 April – Christian Bergelin, politician (died 2008)
15 June – Françoise Chandernagor, writer
20 June – Jean-Claude Izzo, poet, playwright, screenwriter and novelist (died 2000)
30 July – Patrick Modiano, novelist, Nobel laureate
12 August – Jean Nouvel, architect
27 August – Catherine Leroy, photojournalist and photographer (died 2006)
12 October – Aurore Clément, actress
13 October – Christophe (Daniel Bevilacqua), singer-songwriter (died 2020)
16 October – Pascal Sevran, television presenter and author (died 2008)
28 October – François-Xavier Verschave, a founder of NGO Survie (died 2005)

Deaths
5 February -
 Denise Bloch, heroine of World War II (born 1916)
 Lilian Rolfe, heroine of World War II (born 1914)
 Violette Szabo, World War II Allied secret agent (born 1921)
6 February – Robert Brasillach, author, executed for collaboration (born 1909)
23 March – Elisabeth de Rothschild, World War II heroine (born 1902)
30 March – Élise Rivet, nun and World War II heroine (born 1890)
8 June – Robert Desnos, surrealist poet (born 1900)
20 July – Paul Valéry, poet, essayist and philosopher (born 1871)
8 August – Le Pétomane (Joseph Pujol), flatulist (born 1857)
15 October – Pierre Laval, politician and Prime Minister, executed (born 1883)
26 October – Paul Pelliot, sinologist and explorer (born 1878)

See also
 List of French films of 1945

References

1940s in France